Philippine Airlines Flight 143 (PR143) was a domestic flight from the Manila Ninoy Aquino Airport, Manila, Philippines to Mandurriao Airport, Iloilo City. On May 11, 1990, at Manila Ninoy Aquino International Airport the Boeing 737-300 (C/N 24466, MSN 1771) assigned to the route suffered an explosion in the central fuel tank and was consumed by fire in as little as four minutes.

Accident
The air conditioning packs, located beneath the center wing fuel tank of the 737, had been running on the ground before pushback (approximately 30 to 45 minutes). The center wing fuel tank, which had not been filled in two months, likely contained some fuel vapors. Shortly after pushback a powerful explosion in the center fuel tank pushed the cabin floor violently upward. The wing tanks ruptured, causing the airplane to burst into flames.

The majority of the 114 passengers and 6 crew escaped via the emergency chutes, which had been deployed following the blast.

Several passengers reported as many as three explosions in the plane, and Oscar Alejandro, then director of the Philippine Air Transport Office, confirmed the engines had not been started at the time of the blasts.

It is thought the vapors ignited due to damaged wiring, because no bomb, incendiary device, or detonator had been found at the scene. The airline had fitted logo lights after delivery which required passing additional wires through the vapor seals in the fuel tanks. The NTSB recommended to the FAA that an Airworthiness Directive be issued requiring inspections of the fuel boost pumps, float switch, and wiring looms because signs of chafing had been found. The FAA declined to issue the Airworthiness Directive.

Casualties
There were 8 fatalities, including one child, while another 82 people were treated for smoke inhalation and other injuries at the airport clinic. There were no ground fatalities or injuries from the explosion.

See also
TWA Flight 800
Thai Airways International Flight 114

References

Aviation accidents and incidents in 1990
Aviation accidents and incidents in the Philippines
Accidents and incidents involving the Boeing 737 Classic
History of Metro Manila
Philippine Airlines accidents and incidents
1990 disasters in the Philippines
May 1990 events in Asia